Odei Jainaga Larrea (born 14 October 1997) is a Spanish athlete and model specializing in the javelin throw. He represented Spain at the 2020 Summer Olympics in the javelin throw. He is the Spanish national record holder in the javelin throw.

Career
On 12 September 2020, Jainaga set the championship record at the 2020 Spanish Athletics Championships with a distance of 83.51 m and won a gold medal.

On 29 May 2021, Jainaga set the Spanish national record in the javelin throw at the 2021 European Athletics Team Championships Super League with a distance of 84.80 m.

Jainaga represented Spain at the 2020 Summer Olympics in the javelin throw.

Person life
Jainaga's mother, Cristina Larrea, was a Spanish national javelin champion in 1992, 1993 and 1994.

International competitions

References

External links
 
 
 
 

1997 births
Living people
Spanish male javelin throwers
Olympic athletes of Spain
Athletes (track and field) at the 2020 Summer Olympics
Athletes (track and field) at the 2018 Mediterranean Games
Sportspeople from Eibar